Károly Herényi (born 2 December 1950) is a Hungarian politician who served as acting president of the Hungarian Democratic Forum after the 2010 parliamentary election.

Personal life
He is married to Erzsébet Herényiné Nagy, and have four daughters together.

References

MTI Ki Kicsoda 2009, Magyar Távirati Iroda Zrt., Budapest, 2008, 452. old., ISSN 1787-288X
Herényi Károly országgyűlési adatlapja
Herényi Károly életrajza az MDF honlapján

1950 births
Living people
Hungarian Democratic Forum politicians
Members of the National Assembly of Hungary (1998–2002)
Members of the National Assembly of Hungary (2002–2006)
Members of the National Assembly of Hungary (2006–2010)
Politicians from Budapest